The North West Parachute Centre is a BPA affiliated parachuting centre and skydiving drop zone at Cark, Cumbria.

The drop zone operates a PAC XL750 Turbine aircraft. The centre provides student training in the Ram Air Progression System, Accelerated Freefall and Tandem skydiving. The centre provides advanced coaching in formation skydiving and freefly.

Deaths 
Peter Shaw – May 2005

References

External links
 SkydiveNorthwest.co.uk/ – Official Website

Parachuting in the United Kingdom
Sports venues in Cumbria